Fred Chernoff is the Harvey Picker Professor of International Relations at Colgate University. He was born in Los Angeles, California and graduated from Hollywood High School and Rutgers University -- Camden. He holds Ph.D. degrees from Johns Hopkins in philosophy and Yale in political science. His primary works are on international relations theory and the philosophy of social science. He has published two dozen articles on international relations and analytic philosophy and four single-author books. He also owns two splendidly-mannered corgis, Mia and Percival.

Bibliography—Books

Explanation and Progress in Security Studies: Bridging Paradigm Divides in International Relations (Stanford University Press 2014) ISB: 978-0804792264

Theory and Metatheory in International Relations: Concepts and Contending Accounts (Palgrave 2007) 9-781-40397455-6

     Persian-language edition: Alireza Tayeb, trans. (Teheran: Nashr-e Ney, 2009):
          http://www.ibna.ir/vdceof8n.jh8evik1bj.html

The Power of International Theory: Re-forging the Link to Policy-making through Scientific Enquiry (London: Routledge 2005) 

After Bipolarity: Theories of Cooperation, the Vanishing Threat, and the Future of the Atlantic Alliance (Ann Arbor: University of Michigan Press 1995)

References

Chernoff, Fred (2013).  Science, Progress and Pluralism in the Study of International Relations," Millennium: Journal of International Studies, 42.2 p. 346-366.
Chernoff, Fred (2012). "The Impact of Duhemian Principles on Social Scientific Testing and Progress," in Oxford Handbook of the Philosophy of Social Science, New York: Oxford University Press.

External links
http://www.colgate.edu/facultysearch/facultydirectory/fchernoff
http://www.colgate.edu/fchernoff

Colgate University faculty
Living people
Year of birth missing (living people)